is a Japanese politician and a member of the House of Representatives in the Diet (national legislature).

Early life and education
A native of Nara, Mabuchi was born on 23 August 1960. He holds a bachelor's degree in civil engineering, which he received from Yokohama National University in March 1984.

Career
Until 2000, Mabuchi worked in private sector and became director of the firm he was working for at age 32. He was elected to the House of Representatives for the first time in 2003 after an unsuccessful run in 2000. He was appointed senior vice minister of land, infrastructure, transport and tourism in September 2009.

On 17 September 2010, Mabuchi was named as the new minister of land, infrastructure, transport and tourism in the reshuffled Naoto Kan cabinet. Mabuchi left prime minister Kan's cabinet on 14 January 2011, after the then-opposition Liberal Democratic Party (LDP) passed a censure motion against him following the leaking of Japanese Coast Guard footage of the 2010 Senkaku boat collision incident. and ran unsuccessfully to replace him in the DPJ presidential election after Kan stepped down, losing to Yoshihiko Noda, who replaced Kan as Prime Minister. After the Democratic Party of Japan suffered a major defeat to the LDP under Noda at 2012 Japanese general election. Noda resigned to accept responsibility for the defeat.

The resulting DPJ presidential election was held on 25 December 2012, which was contested by Mabuchi and Banri Kaieda. It was won by Kaieda with 90 votes to Mabuchi's 54 votes.

Mabuchi continued to hold his seat until he was narrowly defeated in the 2017 general election. He had the highest ratio of margin of defeat (sekihairitsu) (97.27%) among all defeated candidates in the election. Mabuchi returned to the House in February 2019 after the resignation of Shinji Tarutoko, who was contesting the Osaka 12th district by-election. Being the candidate with the next largest sekihairitsu in Kibō no Tō's 2017 Kinki proportional representation list, Mabuchi was next in line to fill Tarutoko's PR seat. Mabuchi chose to sit as an independent.

Nickname
Mabuchi is a bodybuilder, and has been nicknamed "The Terminator". On the other hand, he calls himself "lone gorilla".

Personal life
Mabuchi is married and has six children, five of whom are girls. His sparetime activities include surfing and cooking.

References

1960 births
Living people
Members of the House of Representatives (Japan)
People from Nara, Nara
Democratic Party of Japan politicians
Ministers of Land, Infrastructure, Transport and Tourism of Japan
Japanese civil engineers
Yokohama National University alumni
21st-century Japanese politicians